Perceptual and Motor Skills is a bimonthly peer-reviewed academic journal established by Robert B. Ammons and Carol H. Ammons in 1949. The journal covers research on perception or motor skills. The editor-in-chief is J.D. Ball (Eastern Virginia Medical School). The journal was published by Ammons Scientific, but is now published by SAGE Publications.

Abstracting and indexing 
Perceptual and Motor Skills is abstracted and indexed in the Social Sciences Citation Index and MEDLINE. In 2017, the journal's impact factor was 0.703.

References

External links 
 

Bimonthly journals
English-language journals
Cognitive science journals
Publications established in 1949
Perception journals
SAGE Publishing academic journals